Cornelis van Eesteren (4 July 1897, Alblasserdam - 21 February 1988, Amsterdam) was a prominent Dutch architect and urban planner. He worked for the Town Planning department of Amsterdam (1929–59) and was the chairman of the CIAM (1930–1947). He contributed to the De Stijl movement, with its founder Theo van Doesburg, the artist Piet Mondrian, and others.

Career
After winning the design competition for the upgrade of the Unter den Linden boulevard in Berlin, in 1927 he became a visiting professor at the Staatliche Bauhochschule in Weimar. From 1929 to 1959 he worked for the Town Planning department of Amsterdam, after which he worked as consultant. After World War II he was appointed professor of urban planning at the Delft University of Technology.

Projects
His key projects include the Amsterdam General Extension Plan, the development plan for the Southern IJsselmeerpolders and the town plan for Lelystad.

Bibliography
Cornelis van Eesteren and Vincent van Rossem (1998) The Idea of the Functional City, NAi Publishers,

References

External links

Van Eesteren Museum (in Dutch)
van Eesteren-Fluck & van Lohuizen Foundation (EFL) (in Dutch)

1897 births
1988 deaths
Dutch architects
Dutch urban planners
Congrès International d'Architecture Moderne members
De Stijl
Academic staff of the Delft University of Technology
People from Alblasserdam
Prix de Rome (Netherlands) winners